Welinton Souza Silva (born 10 April 1989), or simply Welinton, is a Brazilian professional footballer who plays as a centre-back for Turkish club Beşiktaş.

Career

Flamengo
Born in Rio de Janeiro, Welinton debuted, as starter, playing in the first round match of 2009 Copa do Brasil win 5–0 against Ivinhema.

Career statistics

Honours
Flamengo
Campeonato Carioca: 2009, 2011, 2014
Brazilian Série A: 2009

Beşiktaş
Süper Lig: 2020–21
Türkiye Kupası: 2020–21
Süper Kupa: 2021

Brazil U20
South American Youth Championship: 2009

References

External links
 Player Profile @Flapédia
 flamengo.com
 CBF
 

1989 births
Living people
Footballers from Rio de Janeiro (city)
Brazilian footballers
Association football defenders
Brazil youth international footballers
Campeonato Brasileiro Série A players
CR Flamengo footballers
Coritiba Foot Ball Club players
FC Spartak Vladikavkaz players
Umm Salal SC players
Al-Khor SC players
Beşiktaş J.K. footballers
Russian Premier League players
Qatar Stars League players
Süper Lig players
Brazilian expatriate footballers
Brazilian expatriate sportspeople in Russia
Expatriate footballers in Russia
Brazilian expatriate sportspeople in Turkey
Expatriate footballers in Turkey